Paragomphus cognatus (Rock Hooktail) is a species of dragonfly in the family Gomphidae.

Distribution
It is found in Africa, from South Africa to Democratic Republic of the Congo, Uganda and Kenya.

Habitat
Its natural habitats are streams and rivers in a wide variety of vegetation types, including fynbos and grassland, savanna and forest.

Identification

Male: Key features for identification of the males are the shape of the cerci (appendages at the end of the abdomen of males) and the pattern of the markings on the thorax. The ends of the cerci diverge, and they are thick and truncate. In southern Africa (south of 15°S), the shape of the cerci separate this species from other dragonflies.

Habits
Frequents rocky streams, rivers, river-pools. Typically perches on mid-stream rocks.

References

Gomphidae
Taxonomy articles created by Polbot
Insects described in 1842